Motherland is a 1927 British silent war film directed by G. B. Samuelson and starring Rex Davis, Eva Moore and James Knight. The film was made at Isleworth Studios. It is set during the First World War. It aimed to copy the success of the series of war films released by British Instructional Films, but critical reaction was negative.

Cast
 Rex Davis - The Lonely Soldier 
 Eva Moore - Mrs. Edwards 
 James Knight - Private Tom Edwards
 Dorinea Shirley - The Stranger 
 Alec Alexander - Lance Corporal Ikey Abrahamson 
 Peggy Carlisle - Betty 
 Lena Halliday - Mrs. Vibart 
 A. Harding Steerman - Alexander Vibart
 Russell Gorton - Captain Roger Vibart
 Marjorie Spiers - Grace Edwards
 Maurice Redstone - Issy Abrahamson

References

Bibliography
 Low, Rachael. History of the British Film, 1918-1929. George Allen & Unwin, 1971.

External links

1927 films
British war films
British silent feature films
1920s English-language films
Films directed by G. B. Samuelson
Films set in the 1910s
British World War I films
Films shot at Isleworth Studios
British black-and-white films
1927 war films
Silent war films
1920s British films